Leetown, also known as Lee Town, was a historic village in Benton County, Arkansas, United States. The first day of the Battle of Pea Ridge was fought around Leetown.

History
Leetown was founded in the 1840s, by John W. Lee, a farmer from Tennessee. Little is known about the village prior to the American Civil War. It is historically significant for its role as a field hospital for the U.S. Army during the Battle of Pea Ridge. Most, if not all, buildings and structures were used as field hospitals. There are no period buildings remaining, but period fences have been replaced and historic roads have been restored. An active reforestation program has been carried out.

References

Further reading

External links

Pea Ridge National Military Park

1840s establishments in Arkansas
Populated places established in the 1840s
Protected areas of Benton County, Arkansas
Unincorporated communities in Benton County, Arkansas
Unincorporated communities in Arkansas